Nakamura River may refer to the following rivers in Japan:

Nakamura River (Aomori), river in Aomori Prefecture
Nakamura River (Yokohama), river in Yokohama, Kanagawa